Phaiogramma etruscaria is a species of moth of the  family Geometridae.

Description
Phaiogramma etruscaria has a wingspan reaching 17.7-19.3 mm in males, 20-23.3 mm in the females. Wings are light green, with clearly visible white antemedial lines and small marbled striations. Hind tibia bear only terminal spurs in males, two pairs of spurs in females. Antennae are ciliate in males, while in females they are filiform. Adults are on wing from May to June. There is one generation per year. The pupae overwinter.

The larvae are polyphagous and feed on various Apiaceae (Anethum graveolens, Bupleurum, Foeniculum vulgare, Daucus, Ferula, Peucedanum) and on Thapsus, Lotus, Clematis and Rosmarinus.

Distribution
It is found from the Mediterranean Sea area of Europe to central Asia. Records include Russia, Italy, France, the Crimea, Turkmenistan, Kyrgyzstan and Kazakhstan.

Habitat
This species inhabits warm scrubs and xerophilous hillsides.

External links

Moths and Butterflies of Europe and North Africa
Papillon de Poitou-Charentes: species info 

Geometrinae
Moths of Europe
Moths of Asia
Taxa named by Philipp Christoph Zeller